Growth arrest lines, also known as Harris lines, are lines of increased bone density that represent the position of the growth plate at the time of insult to the organism and formed on long bones due to growth arrest. They are only visible by radiograph or in cross-section. The age at which the lines were formed can be estimated from a radiograph. Harris lines are often discussed as a result of juvenile malnutrition, disease or trauma. Other studies suggest a reconsideration of Harris lines as more of a result of normal growth and growth spurts, rather than a pure outcome of nutritional or pathologic stress. The term is named after Henry Albert Harris, 1886-1968, professor for anatomy at the University of Cambridge.

References

Further reading

 
 
 
 

Skeletal disorders
Musculoskeletal radiographic signs